Clear Water Bay Road is a major road from Choi Hung Interchange in Ngau Chi Wan to Clear Water Bay, Sai Kung District. It also is a route to Sai Kung Town and Tseung Kwan O via Hiram's Highway and Hang Hau Road / Ying Yip Road respectively. An expressway deviation, New Clear Water Bay Road, bypasses a steep, winding, 1 in 6 alignment of Clear Water Bay Road near Shun Lee and Fei Ngo Shan.

In 1932, Clear Water Bay Road began from Kowloon City. In 1963, part of the road was renamed Choi Hung Road and Prince Edward Road East.

Description
Clear Water Bay Road begins at Ngau Chi Wan at the junction with Lung Cheung Road, Prince Edward Road East and Kwun Tong Road near MTR Choi Hung station. It then is bypassed by the newer deviation, running past Choi Wan Estate and Fei Ngo Shan south of Kowloon Peak and reaches Cha Liu Au. It then merges with the new road then continues as a four-lane expressway east to Tseng Lan Shue, Pak Shek Wo and Pik Uk and runs downhill to Tai Po Tsai. There is an interchange to Sai Kung with the Hiram's Highway. It continues southward toward the Clear Water Bay Peninsula and junctions Ying Yip Road and Hang Hau Road (to Tseung Kwan O) at a complex roundabout near Silverstrand. The road continues south-east to Sheung Sze Wan, and reaches Tai Au Mun. The road ends south in Tai Hang Tun.

New Clear Water Bay Road
New Clear Water Bay Road is an expressway deviation of Clear Water Bay Road in Kowloon near Choi Wan Estate and Shun Lee Estate. For the section below Kowloon Peak, Clear Water Bay Road is very steep and reaches the ratio of 1 in 6 It is difficult for buses ascending the incline. With the ever-increasing usage of the road due to population increases and the establishment of a country park in Sai Kung, the Hong Kong Government decided to build a new expressway diverging from the junction near Choi Wan Estate, then junctions with Shun Lee Tsuen Road at Shun Lee, then loops back over itself to climb the steep hill and then rejoins the original road at the junction with Anderson Road near Cha Liu Au. The new road was completed in 1980. The loop flyover runs from the hill north of Jordan Valley to Kowloon Peak, and it was the highest bridge in Hong Kong at that time.

Intersections

See also

List of streets and roads in Hong Kong

References

Roads in New Kowloon
Clear Water Bay
Ngau Chi Wan